Khond language may refer to:
Kui language (India)
Kuvi language